Rose Hills Memorial Park is located in Whittier, California. It is currently owned and operated by Service Corporation International (formerly, Loewen Group). It claims to be the largest cemetery in North America.

Sites
 Mausoleums
 Whittier Heights Mausoleum, built in 1917 as "Mausoleum #1" or "The Little Mausoleum", was the second public mausoleum in California (the first being at Anaheim Cemetery in Anaheim) and portrays a sense of early California architecture with its Spanish Renaissance influence.
 Over a period of years, four garden mausoleums (Terrace of Memories, Court of Eternal Light, Mausoleum of the Valley, and Lakeview Mausoleum) were constructed.
 El Portal de la Paz (Doorway of Peace) was dedicated in 1930 as part of the initial expansion program at the cemetery. Complete with an enclosed outdoor garden and fountain, Rose Hills' second mausoleum reflects California's early Spanish Mission era. The hallways are named for the California Missions.
The three-story structure, containing 21,000 niches for the interment of cremated remains, is supported by crimson pillars and golden glazed tiles replicating the architecture of ancient Chinese palaces. The pagoda is associated with Fo Guang Shan's Hsi Lai Temple in Hacienda Heights.

Chapels
 Rainbow Chapel, built in 1942 as "Rose Chapel", is an example of early California Mission architecture. This chapel features large windows overlooking gardens and has a maximum seating capacity of 90 people. It is located behind El Portal de la Paz Mausoleum.
 Hillside Chapel, built in 1956, is a contemporary diamond-shaped structure surrounded by a garden area. The interior was created for an effect of a sunrise through its rose-tinted skylight and -high windows. Hillside Chapel seats up to 182 people. This building is said to have perfect acoustics.
 Sky Church, a glass building also completed in 1956, was destroyed by the Whittier earthquake of 1987.
 Memorial Chapel has three tall, white spires. It was completed in 1964 as a memorial to John D. Gregg, President of Rose Hills from 1950 to 1959 and son of Rose Hills founder Augustus Gregg. Memorial Chapel seats approximately 192 people.
 SkyRose Chapel is on a central hilltop with a view of the San Gabriel Valley, Los Angeles Skylines to the West and Sycamore Valley to the East. SkyRose Chapel seats 300 people. The building consists of three levels, the upper containing a custom Quimby pipe organ, one of the largest in the Los Angeles area. The lower level is an 11,200 sq. ft. mausoleum. The corridors of the mausoleum are named for the woods used in the building's construction.

Gardens

Notable burials
 Alvin Ailey Jr., African American modern dancer
 Lewis Arquette, actor
 George W.C. Baker, Los Angeles City Council member, 1931–35
 Jerry Barber, golfer
 Marlin Briscoe, football player
 Rusty Burrell, Los Angeles County Superior Court sheriff's deputy, and bailiff for Judge Joseph Wapner, The People's Court
 Timothy Carey, actor
 Bob Chandler, NFL wide receiver
 Boyd Coddington, Hot Rod Builder, owner of the Boyd Coddington Hot Rod Shop and star of American Hot Rod
 Sally S. Emory, president of Girls' Friendly Society
 Jaime Escalante, educator
 Ron Glass, actor
 Bryan Gregory, musician, guitarist for The Cramps
 Nathan Wesley Hale, American politician
 Walt Hazzard, basketball player
 Harold A. Henry, Los Angeles City Council president
 Dick Hoerner, American football player
 William Hopper, actor
 Clara Horton, actress
 Anthony Johnson, actor
 T. C. Jones, female impersonator, actor, dancer
 Goodwin Knight, 31st Governor of California
 Nguyễn Cao Kỳ, Prime Minister of South Vietnam
 Jack Larson, actor, played Jimmy Olsen on Adventures of Superman
 Tommy Lasorda,  Los Angeles Dodgers baseball manager
 Billy Laughlin, actor, played Froggy in Our Gang
 Guan Linzheng, Chinese general
 Keye Luke, Chinese-born American actor
 Dave MacDonald, IndyCar driver
 Felicitas Mendez, an American civil rights pioneer.
 Bob Meusel, baseball player of the 1920s
 Haing S. Ngor, Cambodian American physician and actor, winner of the Academy Award for Best Supporting Actor, 1984
 Members of the Richard Nixon family (his parents, Francis A. and Hannah, and his brothers: Harold, Donald, and Arthur; Richard & Patricia Nixon are buried at his presidential library in Yorba Linda.)
 Lupe Ontiveros, actress
 Hsin Ping, Buddhist monk, and abbot of the Fo Guang Shan Buddhist order in Taiwan (portion of ashes)
 Rosa Porto, Cuban-American baker and businesswoman
 Mallie Robinson, mother of Jackie Robinson, MLB's first African-American player
 John Spenkelink, second man to be executed after the reintroduction of the death penalty in the United States
 Robin Stille, American actress (Slumber Party Massacre: Valerie)
 Mark St. John, musician
 Felicia Tang, American actress and model
 Mickey Thompson, American racing legend
 Joseph Tommasi, American Nazi Party leader
 Thuy Trang, Vietnamese-born American actress who was cremated here, played Trini Kwan/Yellow Ranger on Mighty Morphin Power Rangers
 Dương Văn Minh, South Vietnamese President from 1963 to 1964 and 1975
 Alan Wiggins, baseball player of the 1980s
 Eazy-E (Eric Wright), American rapper, hip hop producer, and record executive
 Ellen Beach Yaw, American soprano concert singer

References

External links
 
 
 

1914 establishments in California
Cemeteries in Los Angeles County, California
Puente Hills
Avocado Heights, California
Whittier, California